Stanhopea reichenbachiana is a species of orchid occurring from western Colombia to Ecuador. It is named for the botanists Philip Henry Stanhope, 4th Earl Stanhope and Heinrich Gustav Reichenbach.

References

External links 

reichenbachiana
Orchids of Colombia
Orchids of Ecuador